Paul John Reece (born 16 July 1968) is an English former footballer who played in the Football League for Doncaster Rovers, Grimsby Town, Notts County, Oxford United, Stoke City and West Bromwich Albion.

Career
Reece was born in Nottingham and started his footballing career at Staffordshire side Stoke City. He played just twice for Stoke both came towards the end of the 1986–87 where he deputised for the injured Peter Fox. He conceded six goals in his two matches 4–1 to Shrewsbury Town and 2–1 to Barnsley and was released at the end of the season. He joined Kettering Town for one season and won Player of the Year Award before signing for Grimsby Town for £10,000, where he played regular football. He left for Doncaster Rovers in 1992 and made just one appearance for Doncaster. He joined Oxford United and later played for Notts County, West Bromwich Albion, Ilkeston Town and Northern Irish club Cliftonville.

Reece arrived at Solitude on a free transfer after being recommended to the club by former player Keith Alexander, who had been his manager at Ilkeston and former teammate at Grimsby. He made his debut for the Belfast club in the final of the 1996–97 County Antrim Shield and he saved a penalty in the penalty shootout, ensuring Cliftonville won the trophy for the first time since 1979. He subsequently wore the number one shirt during the club's Irish League title winning season the following year and became established as a club legend in the eyes of the supporters. Reece would also appear for the Reds in the UEFA Champions League qualifier against MFK Košice the following season Later however Reece, who remained based in London during his time at Cliftonville, failed to travel to Belfast for a number of matches and during his absence he lost the number one shirt to Michael Ingham.

Reece subsequently returned to Ilkeston Town, remaining on the club's books until his retirement from playing in 2003. He worked as a goalkeeping coach for Nottingham Forest, Mansfield Town and the Derby County youth team before fulfilling the same role at football training camps.

Career statistics
Source:

References

English footballers
Stoke City F.C. players
Kettering Town F.C. players
Grimsby Town F.C. players
Doncaster Rovers F.C. players
Oxford United F.C. players
Notts County F.C. players
West Bromwich Albion F.C. players
Cliftonville F.C. players
English Football League players
1968 births
Living people
Ilkeston Town F.C. (1945) players
Association football goalkeepers